Bartolomeo Guidobono (1654–1709) was an Italian painter known for his scenes with angelic looking figures bathing in soft lighting, which show the influence of Correggio.  His elegant and graceful style was very popular in Genoa. He is also known as il Prete di Savona (Priest of Savona) or Prete Bartolomeo da Savona (Priest Bartolomeo of Savona).

Life
Guidobono was born in Savona as the son of Giovanni Antonio Guidobono, a maiolica painter. His brother Domenico was a decorative fresco painter. Bartolomeo began as a painter of ceramic earthenware with his father, who worked for the royal court of Savoy. He afterwards went to work as a copyist to Parma, Venice, and Genoa.

Guidobono died in Turin on 4 January 1709.

Work
He appears to have modeled his style on Northern influences such as Gaudenzio Ferrari and Corregio as well as on Caravaggio.

He was admired for his decoration of ornamental parts, such as flowers, fruits, and animals. He helped fresco the Palazzo Centurioni in Genoa. He painted an Inebriation of Lot and in three other subjects for the Palace Brignole Sale. His brother Domenico (1670–1746) helped paint the Duomo of Turin with a glory of angels.

References

Other projects

1654 births
1709 deaths
17th-century Italian painters
Italian male painters
18th-century Italian painters
Italian still life painters
Italian Baroque painters
Fresco painters
Painters from Piedmont
18th-century Italian male artists